The Bada Tower is a tower in Lieyu Township, Kinmen County, Taiwan.

History
The tower was constructed in 1963 by the Republic of China Armed Forces to commemorate the fallen seven soldiers from the 1st squad, regiment 145 from the 25th division in Gubeikou, Peking in 1933 in holding back thousands of Imperial Japanese Army during the Anti-Japanese War.

Architecture
The 8-meter tower is located at the center of a roundabout. On top of it stand statues of soldiers. The propaganda words surrounding the tower reads Fight Independently, Persevere and Survive Death.

See also
 List of tourist attractions in Taiwan

References

1963 establishments in Taiwan
Buildings and structures in Kinmen County
Lieyu Township
Monuments and memorials in Taiwan
Roundabouts and traffic circles in Taiwan
Tourist attractions in Kinmen County
Towers completed in 1963